Van Nuys station  is a station on the G Line of the Los Angeles Metro Busway system. It is named after adjacent Van Nuys Boulevard, which travels north-south and crosses the east-west busway route and is located in the Van Nuys district of Los Angeles, in the San Fernando Valley. Adjacent to the station is the G Line's bicycle path.

The platform features a painting by Roxene Rockwell called The New Town, which shows an example of the wheat and sugar beet fields that marked the area before it was developed.

Service

Station Layout

Hours and frequency

Connections 
, the following connections are available:
 LADOT DASH: Van Nuys/Studio City

History

The rail line through the San Fernando Valley was established by the Southern Pacific in 1893. When the Montalvo Cutoff was constructed in 1904, most traffic was diverted over a new mainline which ran diagonally across the valley and the tracks were relegated to branch status. Pacific Electric interurban trains reached Van Nuys by December 1911, crossing the Southern Pacific tracks at Van Nuys Boulevard.

The Orange Line (now the G Line) began operations over the former Burbank branch with new facilities to serve rapid buses on October 29, 2005.

Future development
As part of the Orange Line Service Improvements Project, which aims to increase bus speeds and capacity through the corridor, the station is planned to be rebuilt on a grade-separated bridge to decrease interference from traffic.

Thus far, A section of LADWP overhead power lines were undergrounded along Atena Street between Vesper Ave and the distribution substation to the east in August 2019. The communication wires were also undergrounded in November 2020, due to a planned TOD (transit oriented development) on the northwestern corner of Van Nuys Blvd and Oxnard St to be built next to the proposed G Line Bridge.

Van Nuys station will serve as the southern terminus of the East San Fernando Light Rail Project light rail line in 2028. In June 2018, Metro staff recommended light rail as the preferred transport mode along this route. This route will connect to Amtrak and Metrolink's Van Nuys train station and Sylmar/San Fernando Metrolink station to the north. Additionally, the Sepulveda Pass Transit Corridor service may connect to the station.

Nearby notable places 
 Van Nuys Municipal Building
 Van Nuys Branch

References

External links
LA Metro: Orange Line Timetable - schedules
LA Metro: Orange Line map and stations - route map and station addresses and features
Orange Line history
LA Metro - countywide: official website

Los Angeles Metro Busway stations
Van Nuys, Los Angeles
G Line (Los Angeles Metro)
Public transportation in the San Fernando Valley
Public transportation in Los Angeles
Bus stations in Los Angeles
2005 establishments in California
Railway stations scheduled to open in 2028
Future Los Angeles Metro Rail stations
Pacific Electric stations
Former Southern Pacific Railroad stations in California